The Rover Meteor was a short-lived 2½-litre or 2-litre medium-sized car made by The Rover Company Limited of Meteor Works Coventry. The new 2½-litre model was announced in mid-February 1930 to supplement Rover's Light Twenty which used the same engine and essentially the same chassis.

A 2-litre car, a further variant of Rover's Light Twenty was announced in July 1932. Under fiscal rating it was a 16-horsepower car and it was renamed Rover Speed Sixteen in mid-1934 but under either name was out of production before April 1935.

The first Meteor was announced a few months into the depression. It is difficult to establish whether models remained in the catalogue from continuing production or they were unsold stock. However it should be remembered it was in this period Rover returned to profit.

The name Meteor was abandoned during 1934, the products remaining in Rover's catalogue as Rover Sixteen (a four-door saloon) and Rover Speed Twenty (a four-seater sports tourer), and in due course they were replaced in the summer of 1936 by the new designs now referred to as P2.

Meteor
The Meteor was a more luxurious, better equipped version of the Light Twenty and considerably more expensive.

Bodywork
The two-door sportsman's Weymann saloon was a comfortable 4-seater and two-thirds of the roof could be folded back. The safety glass windscreen could be opened to avoid turbulence and allow an unobstructed view in poor weather. Instruments included a fuel gauge and water temperature gauge. A cupboard was fitted either side of the instruments. There was a scuttle ventilator, two interior lights and ashtrays for all seats. Rear passengers were given an arm roll either side. The doors were very wide and the front seats could slide and had hinged backrests. A small part of the front section of the window in each door could be wound down out of sight with a quick action handle. There were tools under the front cushions and a spare wheel and tyre in a well on the left hand side front mudguard A coachbuilt saloon was also available and
a seven-seated coachbuilt limousine de luxe. A range of specialised bodies by leading coach builders remained available.

For 1932 new lines were added to the coachwork.

In mid-1932 the new models for 1933 displayed new sound proofing and insulation giving quietness that became a Rover hallmark. These cars also received what also became a Rover hallmark, a combined oil level and petrol gauge. Large headlamps were now supplied which employed a dip and switch device.

Engine and transmission
The engine ran in four main bearings and had a Lanchester vibration damper at its front end as employed by USA's Hudson and Studebaker and Vauxhall's 23-60.

Improvements for 1932 were: a crankcase breather to prevent fumes entering the car, a new silencer, modified springs and shock absorbers, larger wheels.  and Bohnalite alloy pistons.

A supplementary 2-litre version was announced 21 July 1932 it used the 2023 cc 6-cylinder overhead-valve engine of the Rover Light Six in the same body.

Standard equipment was now extensive: automatic clutch, freewheel, automatic engine starting

Brakes suspension steering
Steering was by cam and lever with the box mounted on the car's frame. From 1932 the brake vacuum servo motor was run from the car's gearbox. Brakes were on all four wheels and operated by rods, drums were enclosed. The front brakes used the Perrott principle. The central hand lever used the same brake shoes at the back as the foot brake. Springs were semi-elliptical and flat with gaiters and shock absorbers. The rear springs were outside the frame.

For 1932 there was improved springing. and the next year self-energised Bendix brakes. (i.e. servo-assistance)

Road test, Twenty sportsman's saloon
The tester from The Times said the car travels fast with little fuss but the clutch and change-speed operations were "not outstanding in merit". The suspension allowed too much fore and aft rocking movement.

Speed Meteor
A Speed Meteor Twenty version was announced 21 July 1932. The compression ratio was increased to 6.8 : 1, a downdraught carburettor fitted and an extra large exhaust pipe with special Pullswell silencer. Although a choice of bodywork was available this was a special sports 4-seater with air cushions (for the seats) stone guards for lamps, remote gear change control, extra large faces on the speedometer and revolution counter and Rudge-Whitworth special wire wheels. This Speed model was fitted with a single-plate clutch, 4-speed gearbox with quiet third gear and a central remote control.

Rover Sixteen and Rover Speed Twenty
In September 1933 the Meteor Sixteen and Speed Twenty models remained available for 1934 but the name Meteor was abandoned during 1934 and the cars became Rover Sixteen and Rover Speed Twenty.

The Speed Twenty alone remained available for 1935 with its high compression engine and streamlined ports and manifolds. It was only available as an open four-seater on the same chassis as the Speed Fourteen but the short 112 inch wheelbase.

There was no mention of a Speed Twenty for 1936

Chassis only
Rover's description of items included with the purchase of a chassis for bespoke bodywork: chassis complete with lighting and starting equipment, horn, speedometer, clock, bonnet, front wings, step boards, luggage grid, number plates, shock absorbers, wire wheels, spare wheel and tire, tool kit.

References

External links
1933 Rover Meteor 20 hp saloon
 offside
 near side and engine
 rear view
 drophead coupé by Corsica

Meteor
1930s cars